The Church of the Transfiguration is a Roman Catholic parish community, located in San Jose, California. The parish serves 750 families in the Diocese of San Jose. The church was founded in 1965 as a parish of the Archdiocese of San Francisco, and is named for the Transfiguration of Jesus.

External links
 Transfiguration Catholic Community

References

Roman Catholic Diocese of San Jose in California
Tranfiguration in San Jose, Church of the
Churches in Santa Clara County, California
Roman Catholic churches in San Jose, California